Aerial Consolidated Transport is a taxi and hire car company based in Canberra, Australia. Formed in 1957, it enjoyed monopoly status from 1963, when De-Luxe Taxi Cabs merged with it, until 2007, when a breakaway company, Cabxpress commenced operations.

Aerial (taxis) comprises two brands:
 Canberra Elite. 
 Silver Service.

The Silver Service brand is franchised, based on higher service standards than the standard Canberra Elite Cab service. Silver Service cabs are limousines of a longer wheelbase and higher equipment level than the normal taxis.

References

External links
 A. C. T. website
 South Eastern Cartage Service

Transport in the Australian Capital Territory
Transport companies of Australia
Companies based in Canberra